Andes Technology Corporation is a Taiwanese supplier of 32/64-bit embedded CPU cores and a founding Premier member of RISC-V International Association.  It focuses on the embedded market and delivers CPU cores with integrated development environment and associated software and hardware for SoC development.  Andes is ranked the fifth IP company in the world.   More than 5 billion units of SoC embedded with AndesCore have shipped (2019).

History 
Andes was founded in Hsinchu Science Park, Taiwan in 2005  and went public on the Taiwan Stock Exchange and began trading on 14 March 2017. 

In 2016, Andes joined RISC-V International Association and became the founding Premier member in 2020.  In 2017, Andes expanded its product lines by adding RISC-V processors based on AndeStar™ V5 architecture.

Applications 
Andes CPU cores are applied to applications including 5G, ADAS, AI/machine learning, AR/VR, audio, blockchain, Bluetooth, cloud computing, data centers, gaming, GPS, IoT, MCU, security, sensing, sensor fusion, SSD controllers, storage, touch screen and TDDI controllers, USB 3.0 storage, voice recognition, Wi-Fi, wireless charger and so on.

Partners 
Andes has more than 150 partners, including foundry (such as TSMC, UMC, GlobalFoundries), Electronic Design Automation (EDA), IP, design service (such as Faraday and GUC), key component, development tool, medium & application software, operating software, academic & education, industry & affiliations members.

References

Manufacturing companies based in Hsinchu
Companies listed on the Taiwan Stock Exchange
Electronics companies established in 2005
Semiconductor companies of Taiwan
Taiwanese companies established in 2005